Tigino is a rural locality (a village) in Beketovskoye Rural Settlement, Vozhegodsky District, Vologda Oblast, Russia. The population was 1 as of 2002.

Geography 
Tigino is located 80 km southwest of Vozhega (the district's administrative centre) by road. Mytnik is the nearest rural locality.

References 

Rural localities in Vozhegodsky District